E Meidie (born 30 April 1986) is a retired Chinese Sanda kickboxer. She is the 2015 Kunlun Fight Strawweight Tournament champion, a two time World Wushu Championships and one time Asian Games Wushu Gold medalist.

She was ranked in Combat Press' top ten from November 2016, when female rankings were introduced, until May 2018, when E retired from kickboxing and transitioned into coaching.

Kickboxing career
Following a successful career in Wushu, winning eight gold medals across various competitions, E made her kickboxing transition in 2015. Her accolades in Wushu garnered the attention of Kunlun Fight with whom E signed her first professional contract.

E Meidie participated in the four woman strawweight tournament organized by Kunlun Fight. In the semi final bout she won a unanimous decision against Ji Won Lee, and faced Jemyma Betrian in the finals.  The undefeated Betrian would win a unanimous decision.

In her next fight E fought the WBO title challenger Corina Carlescu, winning the fight by a unanimous decision.

E participated in the 2015 Kunlun Fight strawweight tournament. She won unanimous decisions against Isis Verbeek in the semi final, and Anissa Meksen in the finals.

Championships and accomplishments

Wushu
 2005 Chinese National Wushu Championships -52 kg
 2005 East Asian Games -52 kg
 2007 World Wushu Championships -56 kg
 2007 Taurus Gary Cup National Sanda Championships -52 kg
 2008 Chinese National Wushu Championships -56 kg
 2009 World Wushu Championships -52kg
 2009 World Games - 52kg
 2010 Asian Games -52kg
 2010 World Combat Games -52 kg

Kickboxing
 2015 Kunlun Fight 4-Woman Strawweight Tournament Champion - 52kg
 2014 Kunlun Fight 4-Women Strawweight Tournament Runner-up - 52kg

Kickboxing record

|-  bgcolor="#cfc"
| 2015-10-28|| Win ||align=left| Anissa Meksen || Kunlun Fight 32, Tournament Final || Hong Kong, Hong Kong || Decision (Unanimous) || 3 || 3:00
|-
! style=background:white colspan=9 |
|-  bgcolor="#cfc"
| 2015-10-28|| Win ||align=left| Isis Verbeek || Kunlun Fight 32, Tournament Semi Final || Hong Kong, Hong Kong || Decision (Unanimous) || 3 || 3:00
|-  bgcolor="#cfc"
| 2015-7-18|| Win ||align=left| Palianskaya Viktoria || Kunlun Fight 27, Tournament Quarter Finals || Nanjing, China || Decision (Unanimous) || 3 || 3:00
|-  bgcolor="#cfc"
| 2015-4-26|| Win ||align=left| Valeriya Drozdova || Kunlun Fight 23 || Changsha, China || Decision (Unanimous) || 3 || 3:00
|-  bgcolor="#cfc"
| 2015-2-1|| Win ||align=left| Syuri || K-1 China vs. Japan || Changsha, Hunan, China || Decision (Unanimous) || 3 || 3:00
|-  bgcolor="#cfc"
| 2015-1-1|| Win ||align=left| Sanja Sucevic || K-1 China vs. USA || Changsha, Hunan, China || Decision (Unanimous) || 3 || 3:00
|-  bgcolor="#cfc"
| 2015-1-3|| Win ||align=left| Yoshimi Ohama || Kunlun Fight 15 || Nanjing, China || KO || 2 ||
|-  bgcolor="#cfc"
| 2014-12-4|| Win ||align=left| Lyazzat Akylova || Kunlun Fight 14 || Bangkok, Thailand || KO (Body Punch) || 2 ||
|-  bgcolor="#cfc"
| 2014-10-5|| Win ||align=left| Corina Carlescu || Kunlun Fight 11 || Macau, China || Decision (Unanimous) || 3 || 3:00
|-  bgcolor="#fbb"
| 2014-3-30|| Loss ||align=left| Jemyma Betrian || Kunlun Fight 3, Tournament Final || Harbin, China || Decision (Unanimous) || 3 || 3:00
|-  bgcolor="#cfc"
| 2014-3-30|| Win ||align=left| Ji Won Lee || Kunlun Fight 3, Tournament Semi-Final || Harbin, China || Decision (Unanimous) || 3 || 3:00
|-
| colspan=9 | Legend:

See also
 List of female kickboxers

References 

1986 births
Living people
People from Zhuanghe
Chinese female kickboxers
Kunlun Fight kickboxers
Chinese sanshou practitioners
Asian Games gold medalists for China
Asian Games medalists in wushu
Wushu practitioners at the 2010 Asian Games   
Medalists at the 2010 Asian Games
World Games medalists in wushu
Sportspeople from Liaoning
Kunlun Fight kickboxing champions